= Caesar Mountain =

Mountain summit in West Virginia, US

Coordinates: 38.1470629°N 80.2609062°W

Caesar Mountain is a summit in West Virginia, in the United States. With an elevation of 3,323 feet (1,013 m), Caesar Mountain is the 232nd highest summit in the state of West Virginia.

According to tradition, the summit was named after Caesar, the slave of an early settler.
